Love on the Airwaves is the sixth studio album by Scottish duo Gallagher and Lyle and was released in 1977.

The album contained the U.K. Top 40 single "Every Little Teardrop"

Track listing
All songs are written and performed by Benny Gallagher and Graham Lyle, with additional horn arrangements by John Mumford and Jimmy Jewell and string arrangements by Brian Rogers.

Side 1
 "Love on the Airwaves" - 4:20
 "The Runaway" - 5:53
 "Every Little Teardrop" - 3:52
 "I Had to Fall in Love" - 5:09
 "Street Boys" - 3:46

Side 2
 "Never Give Up On Love" - 3:23
 "Dude in the Dark" - 4:43
 "Head Talk" - 3:49
 "Call for the Captain" - 4:05
 "It Only Hurts When I Laugh" - 2:57

Singer Jean Terrell released her first and only solo album a year after Love on the Airwaves under the name "I Had to Fall in Love". This title is taken from the Gallagher and Lyle song of the same name of which she covered on the album.

Charts

Album Chart Position 
The peak position that the album reached on album charts

Every Little Teardrop 
The lead single from the album, "Every Little Teardrop" charted in some countries:

Personnel
Benny Gallagher - vocals, piano, keyboards, bass guitar, percussion
Graham Lyle - vocals, guitar
Alan Hornall - bass
Iain Rae - piano, organ, synthesizer
Ray Duffy - drums
Jimmy Jewell - saxophone
John Mumford - trombone
Technical
 Geoff Emerick - engineer

References

1977 albums
Gallagher and Lyle albums
A&M Records albums
Albums produced by David Kershenbaum